Chuckey Charles is an award nominated film composer, songwriter and top charting Music  Billboard record producer that moves fluidly from Pop to Rap to R&B, and has produced, written and worked with Grammy winning Songwriters, artist, and Producers from Sean Garrett (Beyoncé Knowles, Janet Jackson, Jamie Foxx) Usher Raymond and Dallas Austin (Gwen Stefani, TLC, etc...) to writer/producer Jerry Ragavoy (The Rolling Stones, Janis Joplin, etc...). He's also produced the soulful sounds of Hidden Beach recording artist Kindred the Family Soul to the Pop/R&B sounds of Capitol Records group Vega, rap artist Loon and "This Is How We Do It" crooner Montell Jordan to name a few. Chuckey Charles was born December 18, 1970 in Chicago, Illinois. He first became interested in music at a very young age, where he started playing the guitar at 6 and gradually moving on to the piano at the young age of 9. Throughout his elementary and high school years he attended Rockford, Illinois C.A.P.A. school for the creative and performing arts. He continued his musical interest where he became the composer of many musical compositions scored along with his orchestra instructor. After graduating from high school and attending a brief stint in college majoring in music theory, Chuckey Charles started to focus on larger aspirations of the music business and industry.

Beginning
In the mid 1990s Chuckey Charles emerged on the Atlanta music scene after the persuasion of a childhood friend who had become acquainted with notable key players in the growing Atlanta music circuit. After visiting and shortly thereafter relocating to Atlanta, Chuckey Charles began working on various studio projects and networking on his own which resulted in song placements on the then popular "Jack The Rapper's" Convention CD Compilation and, the Trey Lorenz project (Sony Music) of that same year.

After taking notice of his production and studio skills, Chuckey Charles began to get the attention of the key players in the "Atlanta Music Circle", in addition to the New York and LA area where he was involved with production work as well. After free lancing
as an independent producer, Chuckey Charles caught the attention of hit making producer Christopher "Tricky" Stewart (Rihanna, Britney Spears,) and the RedZone Entertainment organization, which Stewart had just recently formed, signing Chuckey Charles on as the first Producer to the RedZone Entertainment team. While at RedZone Chuckey Charles worked alongside Grammy award winning Producer Kevin"She'kspere"Briggs (TLC, Destiny's Child, Pink) an affiliate of the RedZone Ent. organization at the time and, Christopher "Tricky" Stewart himself on various projects.

While producing at RedZone, Chuckey Charles had the opportunity to broaden his working relationships with other artists within the music industry such as (Sam Salter, Tamar Braxton, Blaque, Blu Cantrell, The-Dream, Kandi Burruss and Solé) to name a few. While working at RedZone, Chuckey Charles continued to catch the attention of other Production Organizations in the Atlanta area, one being that of D.A.R.P Recordings ran by mega Producer Dallas Austin (Boyz II Men, Michael Jackson). Dallas Austin contracted Chuckey Charles
out to do work for many of his artist on the Freeworld recording label including (Dymond, Vega, Richard Lugo, Debra Killings, and JT Money) and also working with Dallas Austin on various projects as well.

Transition
Branching out in additional areas of the music and entertainment Industry. In 2008 Chuckey Charles appeared as the cover model for best selling author Crystal Perkins-Stell book "Lyfe Afta Cash Money" a trilogy in a series of novels written by the author. Chuckey Charles has also worked as an A&R Director for a recording label distributed through WEA has also established his own Production and Publishing Company Hit'em Twice Productions and Bevlynnesa Music Publishing through BMI. After becoming more involved on the business side of the music industry Chuckey Charles was approached by multi-platinum artist Montell Jordan to become his Tour Manager and Musical Director for scheduled world tours. While traveling Europe, Africa and the Middle East, long flights and late night performances couldn't stop the drive and focus Chuckey Charles and Jordan had when it came time to get into a studio. While in Germany working on Jordan's seventh 2008 album release Let It Rain, Chuckey Charles produced and co-wrote the single "Me and U" which put Jordan back on the Billboard charts after a six-year Billboard absence, entering on the Hot R&B/Hip-Hop Singles & Tracks. in the Hot Shot Debut Position and peaking at #37 on the Billboards Hot Adult R&B Airplay chart.

References

External links
  Billboard Conference Remix Hotel video

Living people
1970 births
Record producers from Illinois
American male composers
21st-century American composers
Songwriters from Illinois
21st-century American male musicians
Musicians from Rockford, Illinois
American male songwriters